The Battle of Drlupa was fought in April 1804 between the Serbian Revolutionaries under Karađorđe and the Dahije (renegade Janissaries) under Aganlija.

Battle
in April 1804, Aganlija and 400 Janissaries went to meet up with Karađorđe to negotiate, but in reality to attack the Serb rebels. Karađorđe's entourage was made up of prominent people and the most prominent commanders, while Aganlija's entourage was made up of twenty-something chosen Turk elders, while the armies of both sides were behind them at half a rifle distance. According to Gavrilo Kovačević, Aganlija had 60 Janissaries and 200 Turks with him, and arrived at Sibnica below the Kosmaj (a village directly by Drlupa), where he met with the band of Karađorđe to discuss peace. The Serbs, however, immediately attacked. It ended in Serbian victory and is viewed as having been a signal for a general uprising against the Ottomans. Aganlija was wounded in the foot, Stanoje Glavaš in the head, while Panta from the Kragujevac nahija and Jovan Đaurović from Baroševac were killed.

After the battle, the rebels went throughout Šumadija, and Karađorđe established firm cooperation with the rebels commanders in the nahije of Belgrade. The Dahije requested aid from the neighboring pashas, but all refused except Pasvanoglu. Aganlija returned humiliated to Belgrade, which greatly excited the common folk (rayah), from which the rebels drew more volunteers, surprising the Ottomans who sought to suppress the uprising.

References

Sources
 
 
 
 
 
 

Drlupa
Drlupa
First Serbian Uprising
Drlupa
1804 in the Ottoman Empire
1800s in Serbia
1804 in Europe
April 1804 events
Sopot, Belgrade